Körpükənd (also, Kërpyukend) is a village and municipality in the Zardab Rayon of Azerbaijan. It has a population of 1,409.

References 

Populated places in Zardab District